In Greek mythology, Oenopion  (Ancient Greek: , Oinopíōn, English translation: "wine drinker", "wine-rich" or "wine face") was a legendary king of Chios, and was said to have brought winemaking to the island, which was assigned to him by Rhadamanthys.

Family
Oenopion was the son of the Cretan princess Ariadne by Dionysus. He was born on Lemnos. His brothers were Thoas, Staphylus, Latromis, Euanthes, and Tauropolis.

By Queen Helike, Oenopion had one daughter, called either Merópē, or Aërō by Parthenius. He also had several sons, namely Melas, Talus, Maron, Euanthes, Salagus and Athamas, who all sailed with him to Chios from Crete.

Mythology 
The most well known story of Oenopion is the one that deals with him receiving the famous giant hunter Orion as a guest, with Orion's subsequent attempt to violate his daughter. The story differs somewhat in different ancient sources; what follows is Hesiod's version. For the details, see Orion.

Orion walked to Chios over the Aegean, and Oenopion welcomed him with a banquet; Orion got drunk and assaulted Merope. In revenge, Oenopion stabbed out Orion's eyes, and then threw him off the island. Hephaestus took pity on the blind Orion and gave him his servant Cedalion as a guide. Cedalion guided him east, where the rising sun restored Orion's sight. Orion then decided to kill Oenopion, but the Chians had built the king an underground fortress, and Orion couldn't find him. (Other sources say it was an iron fortress, built by Hephaestus.) Orion then went to Crete.

Notes

References
Apollodorus, The Library with an English Translation by Sir James George Frazer, F.B.A., F.R.S. in 2 Volumes, Cambridge, MA, Harvard University Press; London, William Heinemann Ltd. 1921. . Online version at the Perseus Digital Library. Greek text available from the same website.
Diodorus Siculus, The Library of History translated by Charles Henry Oldfather. Twelve volumes. Loeb Classical Library. Cambridge, Massachusetts: Harvard University Press; London: William Heinemann, Ltd. 1989. Vol. 3. Books 4.59–8. Online version at Bill Thayer's Web Site
Diodorus Siculus, Bibliotheca Historica. Vol 1-2. Immanel Bekker. Ludwig Dindorf. Friedrich Vogel. in aedibus B. G. Teubneri. Leipzig. 1888-1890. Greek text available at the Perseus Digital Library.
Gaius Julius Hyginus, Astronomica from The Myths of Hyginus translated and edited by Mary Grant. University of Kansas Publications in Humanistic Studies. Online version at the Topos Text Project.
Lucius Mestrius Plutarchus, Lives with an English Translation by Bernadotte Perrin. Cambridge, MA. Harvard University Press. London. William Heinemann Ltd. 1914. 1. Online version at the Perseus Digital Library. Greek text available from the same website.
Parthenius, Love Romances translated by Sir Stephen Gaselee (1882-1943), S. Loeb Classical Library Volume 69. Cambridge, MA. Harvard University Press. 1916.  Online version at the Topos Text Project.
Parthenius, Erotici Scriptores Graeci, Vol. 1. Rudolf Hercher. in aedibus B. G. Teubneri. Leipzig. 1858. Greek text available at the Perseus Digital Library.
Pausanias, Description of Greece with an English Translation by W.H.S. Jones, Litt.D., and H.A. Ormerod, M.A., in 4 Volumes. Cambridge, MA, Harvard University Press; London, William Heinemann Ltd. 1918. . Online version at the Perseus Digital Library
Pausanias, Graeciae Descriptio. 3 vols. Leipzig, Teubner. 1903.  Greek text available at the Perseus Digital Library.

External links

Children of Dionysus
Kings in Greek mythology
Ancient Chians
Cretan characters in Greek mythology
Aegean Sea in mythology